"Bless My Soul" is a song by Powderfinger

Bless My Soul may also refer to:

Music

Albums
Bless My Soul (Tom Shaka album), 2002

Songs
"Hot Patootie – Bless My Soul", a 1973 song in The Rocky Horror Picture Show soundtrack
"Bless My Soul", song by Mark Heard from Appalachian Melody
"Bless My Soul (It's Rock-n-Roll)", by Divinyls from The Collection
"Bless My Soul", song by Tetra Splendour from Splendid Animation
"God Bless My Soul", song by Idle Warship from Habits of the Heart
"Bless My Soul", song by Atlanta Rhythm Section from Dog Days
"Bless My Soul", song by Nightmares on Wax from Smokers Delight
"Bless My Soul", song by Jeff Black from B-Sides and Confessions, Volume One
"Bless My Soul", song by Life written Roger Cotton 1974
"Bless My Soul", song by The Great Divide 1982
"Bless My Soul", song by Sha Na Na J. Barry, B. Bloom 1972